Lee Jin-hyuk (born Lee Sung-joon on June 8, 1996), formerly known by the stage name Wei, is a South Korean singer, rapper and actor. He debuted as a member of South Korean boy band UP10TION in 2015. In 2019, he rose to fame after finishing 14th on Produce X 101. Lee debuted as a solo artist with the release of his first extended play, S.O.L, on November 4, 2019. He debuted as an actor on MBC's drama Find Me in Your Memory as Jo Il-kwon.

Career

Early life
As a child, Lee had an open heart surgery to repair his cardiac valve that did not function properly due to a heart disease.

2015-present: Debut with UP10TION

Lee Jin-hyuk first appeared in UP10TION's pre-debut program “Masked rookie king” in 2015. He was the 9th member to be introduced to the group. He debuted as a member of UP10TION under the stage name Wei. On September 9, UP10TION held a debut showcase at AX Concert Hall in Seoul. UP10TION's debut mini album Top Secret, which includes the debut single "So, Dangerous", was released on September 11, 2015.

2019–present: Produce X 101, solo debut and departure from Up10tion 

Along with fellow member Kim Woo-seok, he took a hiatus from UP10TION group activities and competed as a trainee on Produce X 101. He finished the program ranking 11th, but because of the show's rule of the X position, he did not make the final lineup of X1. Officially, he ranked 14th in the finale.

After Produce X 101 completed, Lee held his first ever solo fan-meeting in Seoul, South Korea on August 10, 2019 followed by fan-meetings in Thailand on September 15, 2019 and in Taiwan on October 13, 2019. He is also holding solo fan-meetings in Philippines and Macau on December 14 and 21 respectively.

TOP Media announced that Lee would be debuting as a solo artist on November 4, 2019. His first extended play, S.O.L, was released, accompanied with the music video of the title track, "I Like That". He held his first solo debut showcase at KBS Arena on November 4, 2019 and the showcase was also broadcast live through Vlive app.

Lee released his second extended play Splash! on June 30, 2020, accompanied with the title track "Bedlam".

Lee debuted as an actor on a drama Find Me in Your Memory as Jo Il-kwon and it made him receive a nominee for MBC Drama Awards in the Best New Actor category. As of October 2020, it is confirmed that Lee will take part in the upcoming KBS2 drama Dear. M, set to be released in 2021, as the role of Gil Mok-jin, a second year student studying Psychology at Seoyeon University.

Lee returned with his third extended play Scene26 on April 5, 2021, accompanied with the title track "5K". In 2021, Lee participated in the semi-drama ON AIR - Secret Contract. Later, Lee was confirmed to be joining the 4-episode drama Check Out the Event which aired on MBC. Lee released his fourth extended play Ctrl+V on October 18, 2021, accompanied by the title track "Work Work".

In 2022, Lee joined the Weverse platform. The same year, he appeared in the SBS drama Why Her. On August 5th, Lee has released spoiler posters for his 5th mini album 'Sight' (5ight), which was released on August 29.

In 2023, Lee will hold a solo concert '4eVer' at Watcha Hall on February 11-12. Later on February 28, it was announced that Lee would be leaving TOP Media, as well as Up10tion, after deciding not to renew his contract which expires on March 11.

Discography

Extended plays

Singles

Filmography

Television series

Web series

Television shows

Web shows

Concert 
 4eVer (2023)

Awards and nominations

Notes

References

External links
 
 
 

Living people
1996 births
21st-century South Korean male singers
South Korean male idols
Produce 101 contestants
K-pop singers
People from Seoul
Musicians from Seoul
Rappers from Seoul
Singers from Seoul